Colleen M. Coyne (born September 19, 1971) is an American ice hockey player. She won a gold medal at the 1998 Winter Olympics.

Playing career
Coyne attended Tabor Academy in Marion, Massachusetts for high school. She was a standout and all-league defensemen for the University of New Hampshire Wildcats. She anchored the American defense on four U.S. Women's National Teams as well as two U.S. Women's Select Teams. Statistically, she earned a plus-7 rating at the 1998 Nagano Winter Games. In 1994, Coyne was featured on a hockey card (1994 Classic Women of Hockey #W26 )

Hockey administration
In 2005, Coyne was elected to the USA Hockey Board of Directors as an athlete representative. In 2008, she was elected to serve on the executive committee. She currently serves on the board of directors for Celebrities For Charities. For the 2010–11 Canadian Women's Hockey League season, she was named to the league Board of Directors.

In 2021, she was named the president of the Boston Pride in the National Women's Hockey League.

Personal
In October 2007, she was announced as a contributor to USCHO.com and their online Game of the Week broadcasts. Coyne is employed in the field of social media. She has been employed by companies such as Groove Networks, Microsoft, and HubSpot in 2006.

Volunteer work
 World Fit

References

External links

1971 births
American women's ice hockey defensemen
Ice hockey players from Massachusetts
Ice hockey players at the 1998 Winter Olympics
Living people
Medalists at the 1998 Winter Olympics
New Hampshire Wildcats women's ice hockey players
Olympic gold medalists for the United States in ice hockey
People from Falmouth, Massachusetts